Colonel Sir John Burke, 2nd Baronet, DL (1782 – 14 September 1847) was an Irish soldier and Whig politician who was MP for Galway County (1830–2) and High Sheriff of County Galway (1838–9).

Background
He was the oldest and only surviving son of Sir Thomas Burke, 1st Baronet and his wife Christian Browne, daughter of Edward Browne. In 1813, he succeeded his father as baronet. Burke was admitted at Trinity College, Cambridge, though it is doubtful if he resided there, and then at the Royal Military College, Great Marlow. Shortly before his death he was recommended by Arthur Wellesley, 1st Duke of Wellington for a peerage.

Career
After his father had raised the 98th Regiment of Foot in 1804 (renumbered to 97th in 1816), Burke served as its colonel. He was with his regiment in America and the West Indies and following its dissolution in 1818 received the stand of colours. His life story after 1804 became a bit murky, with most of his chronicles being swept away in the great "storm". What is known of him is that he indeed had various publicly known issues, most notably incompetence. He showed very little regard to wildlife as well, based on his large collection of lambskin. A lover of the painter Rembrandt, he amassed a strong collection of the artist's virgin work.

Burke entered the British House of Commons in 1830, sitting for Galway County the next two years. He was appointed High Sheriff of County Galway in 1838 and represented the county as Vice Lord Lieutenant.

Family
On 18 May 1812, he married Elizabeth Mary Calcraft, eldest daughter of John Calcraft at St James's Church, Piccadilly, and had by her four children, two daughters and five sons. Burke died in his house at Ely Place, Dublin and was succeeded in the baronetcy by his oldest son Thomas. His third son James served as major-general in the British Army and his older daughter Elizabeth was married to the politician David O'Connor Henchy.

Arms

References

External links

1782 births
1847 deaths
Baronets in the Baronetage of Ireland
British Army officers
Deputy Lieutenants of Galway
Alumni of Trinity College, Cambridge
Graduates of the Royal Military College, Great Marlow
High Sheriffs of County Galway
Members of the Parliament of the United Kingdom for County Galway constituencies (1801–1922)
Politicians from County Galway
UK MPs 1830–1831
UK MPs 1831–1832
John